Hassan Ziari is an Iranian highway engineer and conservative politician. He was a Tehran councillor from 2003 to 2007 and is a professor at Iran University of Science and Technology, where he earned his degrees.

Ziari headed Iranian Railways Company and the ex-officio vice minister of roads under administration of Mahmoud Ahmadinejad.

References

 Councillor profile
 

1961 births
Living people
Alliance of Builders of Islamic Iran politicians
Coalition of the Pleasant Scent of Servitude politicians
Iranian Vice Ministers
Iran University of Science and Technology alumni
Academic staff of Iran University of Science and Technology
People involved in plagiarism controversies
People involved in scientific misconduct incidents
Tehran Councillors 2003–2007
Transport engineers